2 East Taylor Street (also known as the Comer House) is a historic building in Savannah, Georgia, United States. It is located in the northwestern tything block of Monterey Square and was built in 1880. It is part of the Savannah Historic District. It was formerly the home of Hugh Moss Comer (1842–1900), president of the Central of Georgia Railway.

Jefferson Davis, president of the Confederacy, was a guest at the house in 1886 with his daughter Varina Anne Davis. The exterior of the house appears in the Clint Eastwood-directed 1997 movie Midnight in the Garden of Good and Evil. John Cusack's character, John Kelso, is welcomed to town by the home's owner from one of its verandas. The gate in the fenced wall that Kelso walks through has since been removed.

Gallery

See also
Buildings in Savannah Historic District

References

Houses in Savannah, Georgia
Houses completed in 1880
Monterey Square (Savannah) buildings
Savannah Historic District